Nooitgedacht Dam is an earth-fill type dam located on the Komati River in South Africa. It was established in 1962 and serves mainly for irrigation purposes as well as municipal and industrial use. The hazard potential of the dam has been ranked high (3).

See also
List of reservoirs and dams in South Africa

References 

 List of South African Dams from the Department of Water Affairs

Dams in South Africa
Dams completed in 1962